Frank George Pauly  (January 24, 1904 – June 10, 1968) was a professional American football player for the Chicago Bears.

He attended high school at Waite High School in Toledo, Ohio.  He attended Washington & Jefferson College.  At one time, Washington & Jefferson proclaimed him to be the largest college football player, weighing in at 303 pounds; however that weight was taken at halftime of a particularly muddy game and Pauly's weight was inflated by over 40 pounds.  His actual weight at the time was 256 pounds.

Following his professional career, he coached high school football at his alma mater, Waite High School.  He also worked as attendance officer for the board of education.

References

External links
 

1904 births
1968 deaths
American football tackles
Chicago Bears players
Washington & Jefferson Presidents football players
High school football coaches in Ohio
People from Hancock County, Ohio
Sportspeople from Toledo, Ohio
Players of American football from Ohio